Robert III of Artois (1287 – between 6 October & 20 November 1342) was Lord of Conches-en-Ouche, of Domfront, and of Mehun-sur-Yèvre, and in 1309 he received as appanage the county of Beaumont-le-Roger in restitution for the County of Artois, which he claimed. He was also briefly Earl of Richmond in 1341 after the death of John III, Duke of Brittany.

Life

Origin
Robert was the son of Philip of Artois, Lord of Conches-en-Ouche and Blanche of Brittany, daughter of John II, Duke of Brittany. Both were descended in male line from the Capetian dynasty.

He was only eleven when his father died in September 1298 from wounds he received at the Battle of Furnes on 20 August 1297 against the Flemish people. The early death of his father was an indirect cause of the dispute over the succession to the County of Artois.

Guardianship
After the death of his grandfather Robert II, Count of Artois, in the Battle of Courtrai in 1302, his grandfather's daughter Mahaut of Artois, inherited the County of Artois, in accordance with custom, for she was his eldest child. Because of his age, Robert III could not object to his aunt Mahaut and assert the rights which he inherited from his father. He would do so later. The rancor and intrigues between Mahaut (sometimes called Mathilde) and Robert occurred within a period of strife between France and England, before the Hundred Years' War.

Influence
Robert played an important role in the succession of Philip VI of France to the throne, and was his trusted adviser for some time. From this influence he gained the county of Beaumont-le-Roger from Philip VI in June 1328, as compensation for Mahaut inheriting Artois.   At Mahaut's death in 1329, the claim then passed to her daughter Joan II, Countess of Burgundy. Building on the example of the estate of the County of Flanders, Robert again raised the matter of succession.

The fraudulent will
However, in 1331, he used a forgery created by Jeanne de Divion which attested to the will of his father. This deception was discovered and Robert lost any hope of acquiring Artois. The forger Divion was condemned at the stake. Robert's property was confiscated by King Philip VI in 1331, and consequently his wife and his sons John and Charles were imprisoned.

Refuge in the Holy Roman Empire
Robert therefore fled France in 1332, to escape arrest and execution, and took refuge with his nephew John II, Marquis of Namur. King Philip VI hence requested that the Bishop of Liège attack Namur. Accordingly, Robert fled again to John III, Duke of Brabant, his nephew-in-law. Again, the influence of King Philip VI stirred up a war against Brabant and Robert was exiled again, this time to England.

Refuge in England
There he took up with King Edward III of England and urged the English king to start a war to reclaim the Kingdom of France. While in England, Robert became a member of King Edward's royal council and provided extensive information on the French court to the king of England. Numerous contemporary chroniclers relate how Robert's influence led directly to the start of the Hundred Years' War, specifically because King Philip VI cited King Edward III's unwillingness to expel Robert as the reason for confiscating the Duchy of Aquitaine in May 1337. A vowing poem called the Voeux du héron (Vow of the Heron) circulated in France and England in the late 1340s that depicted Edward III's invasion of France as the fulfillment of a chivalric oath made to Robert that he would take the French throne, as was his dynastic right.

Robert thereafter followed King Edward III in his campaigns, including command of the Anglo-Flemish army at the Battle of Saint-Omer in 1340.

Breton War of Succession
He ultimately succumbed to dysentery after being wounded while retreating from the city of Vannes in November 1342, during the War of the Breton Succession. He was originally buried in the church in Blackfriars, London, though his grave is now in St. Paul's Cathedral.

Family
Around 1320 Robert married Joan, daughter of Charles of Valois and his second wife Catherine I of Courtenay. They had:
 Louis (1320–1326/29).
 John (1321–1387), Count of Eu.
 Joan (1323–1324).
 Jacques (c. 1325–1347).
 Robert (c. 1326–1347).
 Charles (1328–1385), Count of Pezenas.

In fiction
Robert III of Artois is a major character in Les Rois maudits (The Accursed Kings), a series of French historical novels by Maurice Druon in which many of these events are retold. He was played by Jean Piat in the 1972 French miniseries adaptation of the series, and by Philippe Torreton in the 2005 adaptation.

See also
 List of works by James Pradier

References

Sources

People of the Hundred Years' War
House of Artois
Counts of Beaumont
1287 births
1342 deaths
Male Shakespearean characters
14th-century peers of France
Earls of Richmond
Peers created by Edward III